Huimin County is a county of northwestern Shandong province, People's Republic of China. It is under the administration of Binzhou City.

The population in 1999 was 620,335.

Geography and climate

Huimin County has a monsoon-influenced, humid continental climate (Köppen Dwa), with hot, humid summers, and cold, very dry winters. A majority of the annual precipitation occurs in July and August alone. With monthly percent possible sunshine ranging from 47% in July to 63% in October, the county receives 2,563 hours of bright sunshine annually, sunshine is abundant except during the summer months.

Administrative divisions 
There are three subdistricts and 12 towns in the county:

Subdistricts:
Sunwu Subdistrict, Wudingfu Subdistrict, Hefang Subdistrict

Towns:
Shimiao, Sangluoshu, Zijiao, Huji, Lizhuang, Madian, Weiji, Qinghe, Jianglou, Xindian, Danianchen, Zaohuli

References

External links
 Official site

 
Counties of Shandong
Binzhou